Johan Falkmar (born 10 November 1991) is a Swedish footballer.

Career

Dalkurd FF
In December 2019, Falkmar signed a two-year contract with Dalkurd FF.

References

External links 
 

Swedish footballers
1991 births
Living people
Allsvenskan players
Superettan players
Ettan Fotboll players
Karlstad BK players
Vasalunds IF players
IF Brommapojkarna players
Dalkurd FF players
Association football defenders